The men's 3000 metres steeplechase event at the 1999 Pan American Games was held on July 25.

Results

References

Athletics at the 1999 Pan American Games
1999